Nicola Ann Sullivan (born 15 August 1958) is a British Church of England priest. She is the current dean of Southwell and previously Archdeacon of Wells

Early life and education
Sullivan was brought up in Suffolk. She qualified as a nurse in 1981 and a midwife in 1984, after which she worked both in the United Kingdom and, with Tearfund, in Swaziland and Ethiopia.

Ordained ministry
She was ordained in 1995 and her clerical career began with a curacy at St Anne's Church in Earlham near Norwich. In 1999 she took up the post of associate vicar at Bath Abbey and became chaplain to the Bishop of Bath and Wells in 2002. She was made Sub-Dean of Wells Cathedral in 2003.

Sullivan was appointed Archdeacon of Wells and a Canon Residentiary of Wells Cathedral in 2007. The role of archdeacon involves oversight of 200 parishes in the eastern half of the county of Somerset.

In 2013, Sullivan was elected as one of eight senior women clergy, called "regional representatives", to attend meetings of the House of Bishops, one of the three chambers of the General Synod of the Church of England, the church's legislature. As regional representative for the south-west of England (comprising the dioceses of Truro, Salisbury, Bath & Wells, Gloucester, Bristol and Exeter), she will attend meetings of the house in a speaking, but non-voting, capacity until such time as six women sit as full members of the house.

On 4 April 2016, it was announced that Sullivan was to become Dean of Southwell from her installation there on 17 September 2016.

References

1958 births
Archdeacons of Wells
Living people
Provosts and Deans of Southwell